Nemotelus cingulatus is a species of soldier fly described by Dufour in 1852.

References

Stratiomyidae
Insects described in 1852